The Great War and Modern Memory is a book of literary criticism written by Paul Fussell and published in 1975 by Oxford University Press.  It describes the literary responses by English participants in World War I to their experiences of combat, particularly in trench warfare.  The perceived futility and insanity of this conduct became, for many gifted Englishmen of their generation, a metaphor for life.  Fussell describes how the collective experience of the "Great War" was correlated with, and to some extent underlain by, an enduring shift in the aesthetic perceptions of individuals, from the tropes of Romanticism that had guided young adults before the war, to the harsher themes that came to be dominant during the war and after.

Genres
Fussell's criticism crosses genre boundaries, attempting to describe how the experience of the war overwhelmed its participants and forced them to share a common atmosphere in their essays, letters home, novels, humor, and poetry.  This experience, in turn, dealt a death-blow to the way they and their peers had responded to the prewar world.  Fussell later (1996) described what he had found to an interviewer from the National Endowment for the Humanities:

Also, I was very interested in the Great War, as it was called then, because it was the initial twentieth-century shock to European culture. By the time we got to the Second World War, everybody was more or less used to Europe being badly treated and people being killed in multitudes. The Great War introduced those themes to Western culture, and therefore it was an immense intellectual and cultural and social shock.

People
Fussell describes the lives and works of many figures, but centers on four key writers of early English Modernist literature who became productive, or who significantly changed the form of their literary work, in combat on the Western front: Edmund Blunden, Robert Graves, Wilfred Owen, and Siegfried Sassoon.  In many cases, the experiences of trench warfare not only affected what these and other authors wrote during the conflict, but (if they survived the war) shaped their output for the remainders of their lives.

Honors
The Great War and Modern Memory was honored with the last annual National Book Award in category Arts and Letters and with the inaugural National Book Critics Circle Award for Criticism.  It was ranked #75 on the Modern Library's list of the 100 best non-fiction books of the 20th century.

Criticism

Historian Jay Winter critiqued The Great War and Modern Memory in 1995 for what he saw as deliberately passing over the experiences of other soldier-writers who found conventional and traditional motifs adequate to describe their states of mind: "This vigorous mining of eighteenth and nineteenth century images and metaphors to accommodate expressions of mourning is one reason why it is unacceptable to see the Great War as the moment when ‘modern memory’ replaced something else, something timeworn and discredited".

Dan Todman joined this criticism in 2005: "In terms of cultural history, Fussell came to his subject with a strict theoretical framework and then selected texts which supported his case.  He therefore blinded himself to the variety of different literary reactions to the war, which included not only a striving for new modes of expression but also a falling back onto reassuring traditions … The Great War and Modern Memory is, in other words, a work of polemic rather than analysis and has to be treated as such."  Todman buttressed his assertions by pointing out the socially unrepresentative status of many of Fussell's protagonists.  Many of them young men drawn from English public schools and the highest levels of society, some of them were cut off from the ability of enduring cultural traditions to appeal to the ranks.  Ordinary soldiers were more likely, asserts Todman, to read authors like Rudyard Kipling who responded to the Great War in ways that held harmless the heritage of men at arms.

In History Today, Daniel Swift in 2014 drew attention to "the odd paradox of this book: it is a superb study of the literature and language of the Great War and specifically the metaphors and myths by which it was waged. ... But the book is also a weak, often simplistic, account of almost everything before and after the war. It is great literary criticism and lousy history."

References

Books of literary criticism
National Book Award-winning works
1975 non-fiction books
Aftermath of World War I in the United Kingdom
Oxford University Press books